The 2008 Philippine Collegiate Championship is the inaugural tournament of the Philippine Collegiate Championship (PCC) for basketball in its current incarnation, and the sixth edition overall. The champion teams from the University Athletic Association of the Philippines (UAAP), National Collegiate Athletic Association (NCAA), the Cebu Schools Athletic Foundation, Inc. (CESAFI) and 3 other Metro Manila leagues took part in the final tournament dubbed as the "Sweet Sixteen". Other teams had to qualify in the zonal tournaments to round out the 16 teams in the tournament.

The De La Salle Green Archers defeated arch-rivals Ateneo Blue Eagles in the championship; budding rivals Letran Knights and the San Beda Red Lions disputed third place, with Letran winning.

The winners would have qualified for the 2009 Summer Universiade in Serbia as the Philippine representative. However, FISU thumbed down an application by the SBP and the Philippine Olympic Committee. As a result, other international tournaments were lined up for the champion team. The 1967 UE Red Warriors led by Robert Jaworski and Danny Florencio was the last team to participate in the Universiade's basketball tournament.

Solar Sports served as the main coverage partner, with the games broadcasting on C/S 9 and Basketball TV.

Rankings

Metro Manila

Cebu

Region 1 (Dagupan, Pangasinan, Baguio)

Region 2 (Pampanga, Tarlac, Bulacan)

Region 3 (Quezon, Bicol)

Region 4 (Iloilo, Bacolod)

Region 5 (Dumaguete, Bohol)

Region 6 (Tacloban, Ormoc, Samar)

Region 7 (Cagayan de Oro, Misamis Oriental, Caraga)

Region 8 (Davao, Soccsksargen, Maguindanao)

Region 9 (Zamboanga, Misamis Occidental)

Qualifying

Regional championships has four teams in each of the nine regions: one team per region qualifies for the zonal championships.
Wildcard qualifying has eight teams split into two groups: top two teams per group qualifies for the zonal championships.
Zonal championships has four zones divided into two groups composed of two groups: the top team from each group qualifies for the round of 16.

Automatic qualifiers
  - UAAP champion
  - UAAP runner-up
  - NCAA champion
  - NCAA runner-up
  SSC-R Cavite Baycats - NAASCU champion
  MLQU Stallions - CUSA champion
  UCN Golden Dragons - UCAA champion
  UV Green Lancers - CESAFI champion

Regional championships
Winners qualify for the zonal championships:
 Region 1: SLU Navigators
 Region 2: U of Luzon Tigers
 Region 3: UNC Greyhounds
 Region 4: WNU Mustangs
 Region 5: U of Luzon Tigers
 Region 6: AMA Computer Learning Center - ACLC College Ormoc
 Region 7: Capitol Stallions
 Region 8: U of Mindanao Wildcats
 Region 9: Ateneo de Zamboanga Blue Eagles

Wildcard qualifying

Top two teams from each group qualify for the zonal championships:

Group A

Group B

Zonal championships

Winners from the regional championships and wildcard qualifying are drawn into four different teams: each zone has to have only one wildcard team.

Zone 1
Games were held at the Makati Coliseum from November 3–6:

Zone 2
Games were held at the Makati Coliseum from November 3–6:

Zone 3
Games were held at the Ormoc City Superdome from November 9–11:

Zone 4
Games were held at the Xavier University Gym from November 14–17:

Qualifying teams

Bracket

Round of 16

Quarterfinals

Semifinals

Third-place playoff

Final

Awards
Most Valuable Player: JV Casio (La Salle)
Mythical 5:
JV Casio (La Salle)
Rico Maierhofer (La Salle)
R.J. Jazul (Letran)
Nonoy Baclao (Ateneo)
Rabeh Al-Hussaini (Ateneo)
Best Coach: Franz Pumaren (La Salle)

Record per league

The CUSA and the UCAA went 0–1. Other provincial leagues aside from the CESAFI failed to qualify.

References

External links
Collegiate Champions League official website

2008
2008–09 in Philippine basketball leagues